is a passenger railway station in the city of Maebashi, Gunma Prefecture, Japan, operated by the private railway operator Jōmō Electric Railway Company.

Lines

Station layout
The station consists of a single side platform serving traffic in both directions.

Adjacent stations

History
Akasaka Station opened on December 18, 1933.

Surrounding area
Maebashi Fire Department Akasaki sub-station

See also
 List of railway stations in Japan

External links

  
	

Stations of Jōmō Electric Railway
Railway stations in Gunma Prefecture
Railway stations in Japan opened in 1933
Maebashi